George Arthur Buttrick (March 23, 1892 – January 23, 1980) was an English-born, American-based Christian preacher, author and lecturer.

Early life
Buttrick was born in Seaham Harbour, England on March 23, 1892. He attended the Victoria University of Manchester and later emigrated to the United States.

Career
Buttrick served as a pastor in Quincy, Illinois, Rutland, Vermont, Buffalo, New York, and in 1927 he succeeded Henry Sloane Coffin as minister of the Madison Avenue Presbyterian Church in New York City.

In 1936, Buttrick officiated the marriage of Fred and Mary Anne MacLeod Trump, the parents of Donald Trump.

Buttrick gave a lecture series at Yale University.  From 1955 to 1960 he was Plummer Professor of Christian Morals and Preacher to the university at Harvard University. He was then a guest professor at the Union Theological Seminary in the City of New York and went on to teach at Garrett–Evangelical Theological Seminary in Evanston, Illinois. He later taught at Davidson College in Davidson, North Carolina, Vanderbilt University in Nashville, Tennessee, and the Southern Baptist Seminary in Louisville, Kentucky. He also taught classes on preaching at Louisville Presbyterian Theological Seminary.

Buttrick was also Commentary Editor for The Interpreter's Bible, a twelve volume set of the Holy Scriptures, in the King James and Revised Standard Versions with general articles and introduction, exegesis and exposition, first published by Abingdon-Cokesbury Press in 1952.

Death and legacy
Buttrick died in 1980. His son, David G. Buttrick (1927–2017), was a Presbyterian minister who later joined the United Church of Christ and became the Drucilla Moore Buffington Professor of Homiletics and Liturgics at the Vanderbilt University Divinity School.

Frederick Buechner has often cited Buttrick as a central influence on his career, including his decision to become himself a Presbyterian minister.

Bibliography
Parables of Jesus (1928)
Jesus Came Preaching: Christian Preaching in the New Age (1931)
Christian Fact and Modern Doubt (1934)
Prayer (1942)
Christ and Man's Dilemma (1946)
So We Believe, So We Pray (1951)
Faith and Education (1952)
Sermons Preached in a University Church (1959)
Biblical Thought and the Secular University (1960)
 Editor, Interpreter's Dictionary of the Bible, 4 vols (1962)
Christ and History (1963)
God, Pain, and Evil (1966)
The Beatitudes, A Contemporary Meditation (1968)
The Power of Prayer Today (1970)

References

1892 births
1980 deaths
People from Seaham
Alumni of the Victoria University of Manchester
Harvard University faculty
Vanderbilt University faculty
English emigrants to the United States
Davidson College faculty